The poiseuille (symbol Pl) has been proposed as a derived SI unit of dynamic viscosity, named after the French physicist Jean Léonard Marie Poiseuille (1797–1869).

In practice the unit has never been widely accepted and most international standards bodies do not include the poiseuille in their list of units.  The third edition of the IUPAC Green Book, for example, lists Pa⋅s (pascal-second) as the SI-unit for dynamic viscosity, and does not mention the poiseuille.

The equivalent CGS unit, the poise, symbol P, is most widely used when reporting viscosity measurements.

References

Bibliography 
 François Cardarelli (2004). Encyclopaedia of Scientific Units, Weights and Measures. Springer-Verlag London Ltd. 

SI units
Units of dynamic viscosity